is a private women's college in Amagasaki, Japan, established in 1966.

External links
 Official website 

Educational institutions established in 1966
Private universities and colleges in Japan
Universities and colleges in Hyōgo Prefecture
1966 establishments in Japan
Women's universities and colleges in Japan
Amagasaki